Asikiya Albright George, known simply as Asikey or Asikey George, is a Nigerian singer and songwriter. Her music is a mixture of alternative rock, pop and soul. In 2017, she won Best Female Artist in Inspirational Music at the All Africa Music Awards. Asikey was listed by the Daily Trust newspaper as one of the ten best Nigerian artists of 2017.

Early life and education 
Born in a family from Rivers State, Asikey spent her early years in Ogun State. She is an alumnus of the University of Nigeria, where she studied history and international studies. She describes herself as non-religious despite having a Christian background and incorporating religious themes into her music.

Music career 
Due to her style of music, Asikey has been likened to Aṣa by the media, with TooXclusive labeling her as "Africa's next Asa". In a 2017 interview with Afrovibe, she admitted to the significance of Asa in her music, specifically mentioning the impact that Bed of Stone had on her.

In 2016, Asikey released her debut extended play Human under Pendulum Records. It was promoted and marketed by Lanre Lawal's Bail Music Company. Comprising seven tracks, Human grapples with existential topics like freedom and existence. The EP's track list received critical response from critics and consumers, with many noting its unique style. Reviewing for 360nobs, Wilfried Okichie said Human "does not grab you by the balls demanding for attention, neither is it designed to do so. It takes a subtler path using understated production and effective song writing that can be a detriment in these parts."

On 1 May 2020, Asikey released her 7-track second extended play titled Yellow. It was produced entirely by Mikky Me Joses and features a collaboration with singer Brymo. The EP explores topics such as mental health, self-love and upliftment. In a review for Pulse Nigeria, Motolani Alake awarded the EP a seven out of ten rating, praising its production and commending Asikey for making her words believable and being "cursed with projecting her honesty".

Discography

EPs
Human (2016)
Yellow (2020)

Selected singles
"Dark" (2017)
"Love with You" (2019)
"We (Don't Let Me Go)" (2019)

References 

Living people
Nigerian women singer-songwriters
Nigerian singer-songwriters
Nigerian soul musicians
Nigerian women guitarists
University of Nigeria alumni
Nigerian rock musicians
Year of birth missing (living people)